KTWB is a radio station in Sioux Falls, South Dakota airing a country music format. The station is owned by Duey E. Wright, through licensee Midwest Communications, Inc.

Its studios are located on South Phillips Avenue in Sioux Falls, while its transmitter is located near Rowena.

On October 28, 2013, KTWB and its country format moved to 92.5 FM, swapping frequencies with adult contemporary-formatted KELO-FM, which moved to 101.9 FM.

History 
After a 52-year history in Sioux Falls radio, Midcontinent sold all of its stations, including KTWB, to Backyard Broadcasting of Baltimore in 2004. It marked the company's exit from broadcasting, having sold off KELO-TV in 1996. Backyard sold its seven Sioux Falls stations in 2012 to their present owner, Midwest Communications, in a $13.35 million transaction.

References

External links
KTWB Big Country 92.5 website

TWB
Country radio stations in the United States
Radio stations established in 1992
Midwest Communications radio stations
1992 establishments in South Dakota